Emil Damgaard (born 20 August 1998) is a Danish retired footballer who played as a right back.

Club career

FC Nordsjælland
Damgaard came to FC Nordsjælland at the age of 11 from Slagslunde-Ganløse IF.

He got his debut for FC Nordsjælland on 1 May 2016 at the age of 17, where played 26 minutes, before he got an anterior cruciate ligament injury. He got replaced by Pascal Gregor in the 2-2 draw against Randers FC in the Danish Superliga. He began his rehabilitation in the winter 2016 but unfortunately, his new ligament broke again and thus a new surgery was required. He began training again in the summer break and took with the first team squad to the Netherlands.

Damgaard got promoted to the first team squad on 6 July 2017. He had a tough beginning of the new season, where he was out with several injuries. Due to his several injuries, his contract wasn't extended and he left the club at the end of the 2018-19 season. Damgaard decided to give up his dream and retired at the age of 22 due to the injuries.

References

External links
 
 Emil Damgaard at DBU

1998 births
Living people
Danish men's footballers
Danish Superliga players
FC Nordsjælland players
Denmark youth international footballers
Association football defenders